Germany will compete at the 2009 World Championships in Athletics from 15–23 August as the host nation. A team of 92 athletes was announced in preparation for the competition, but current women's Marathon world leader Irina Mikitenko and hurdler Thomas Goller withdrew from the Championships. Mikitenko was replaced by the current European Champion Ulrike Maisch. Selected athletes have achieved one of the competition's qualifying standards. Six out of the seven medallists for Germany from the last Championships are competing, including the gold medallists Betty Heidler and Franka Dietzsch. Women's high jump world leader Ariane Friedrich and European record holders Christina Obergföll and Sebastian Bayer are among Germany's other aspiring medallists.

Team selection

Track and road events

Field and combined events

Medalists
The following competitors from Germany won medals at the Championships.

Results

Men
Track and road events

Field events

Women
Track and road events

Field and combined events

References

External links
Official competition website

Nations at the 2009 World Championships in Athletics
World Championships in Athletics
Germany at the World Championships in Athletics